The Ottoman Empire was governed by different sets of laws during its existence. The Qanun, sultanic law, co-existed with religious law (mainly the Hanafi school of Islamic jurisprudence). Legal administration in the Ottoman Empire was part of a larger scheme of balancing central and local authority. Ottoman power revolved crucially around the administration of the rights to land, which gave a space for the local authority develop the needs of the local millet. The jurisdictional complexity of the Ottoman Empire was aimed to permit the integration of culturally and religiously different groups.

Legal system
The Ottoman system had three court systems: one for Muslims, one for non-Muslims, involving appointed Jews and Christians ruling over their respective religious communities, and the "trade court". The codified administrative law was known as kanun and the ulema were permitted to invalidate secular provisions that contradicted the religious laws. In practice, however, the ulema rarely contradicted the Kanuns of the Sultan.

These court categories were not, however, wholly exclusive: for instance, the Islamic courts—which were the Empire's primary courts—could also be used to settle a trade conflict or disputes between litigants of differing religions, and Jews and Christians often went to them to obtain a more forceful ruling on an issue. The Ottoman state tended not to interfere with non-Muslim religious law systems, despite legally having a voice to do so through local governors.

The Ottoman Islamic legal system was set up differently from traditional European courts. Presiding over Islamic courts would be a Qadi, or judge. However, the Ottoman court system lacked an appellate structure, leading to jurisdictional case strategies where plaintiffs could take their disputes from one court system to another until they achieved a ruling that was in their favor.

Throughout the 19th century, the Ottoman Empire adhered to the use of three different codes of criminal law. The first was introduced in 1840, directly following the Edict of Gülhane, an event which started the period of the Tanzimat reforms. In 1851, a second code was introduced. In this one, the laws were nearly the same as the ones in the first code of laws, but included the rulings of the previous eleven years. In 1859, the Ottoman Empire promulgated a last code of law inspired by the 1810 Napoleonic criminal code. Each of these variations of code and legislations represented a new phase in Ottoman legal ideology.

The Ottoman judicial system institutionalized a number of biases against non-Muslims, such as barring non-Muslims from testifying as witnesses against Muslims. At the same time, non-Muslims "did relatively well in adjudicated interfaith disputes", because anticipation of judicial biases prompted them to settle most conflicts out of court.

Kanun
The Kanun fulfilled the role of Siyasa, being used along with religious law. Its use originates from the difficulty to address certain matters (such as taxation, administration, financial matters, or penal law) by Sharia alone, which led the Ottoman rulers to use the Kanun to supplement, and sometimes supplant, religious law. It also offered a way to overcome the problems posed by the extent to which Sharia depended on the interpretation of sources by the ulema, which had made legal standardisation problematic.

The Ottoman Kanun first began to be codified towards the end of the 15th century, after the fall of Constantinople in 1453. The expansion of the empire led to a desire to centralise decisions, and the Kanun allowed the sultan to become an unchallenged ruler, by granting him the power he needed to exercise his authority to the full.

The early Kanun-name (literally: "book of law") were related to financial and fiscal matters, and based on custom (örf), they tried to reconcile previously existing practices with the priorities and needs of the Ottoman state. Kanun-names were also granted to individual provinces following their conquest; these provincial books of law would typically maintain most of the taxes and dues existing under the previous rule, and simply adapt them to an Ottoman standard.

The use of Kanun redefined Ottoman society in a two-tiered hierarchy, with the askeri (or military) consisting of a tax-exempt ruling class which included the "men of the sword", the "men of the book", and the "men of the pen", while the rest of the population, labeled as the reaya ("flock") was at the bottom, with the duty to produce and pay taxes.

One example of Kanun was the "law of fratricide", which required the new sultan to kill all his brothers upon ascending the throne, and had been enacted for fear of a repetition of the fratricidal conflicts that had plagued early successions.

In Turkish, Suleiman the Magnificent is known as "Kanuni", the "Lawgiver", for his contribution to the formulation of Ottoman sultanic code.

Reform efforts

In the late 19th century, the Ottoman legal system saw substantial reform. This process of legal modernization began with the Edict of Gülhane of 1839. These series of law reforms (also referred to as Tanzimât Fermânı) began a new period of modernity in the Ottoman Empire that would pave the way for new Western ideas of politics and social ideology. These reforms included the "fair and public trial[s] of all accused regardless of religion", the creation of a system of "separate competences, religious and civil", and the validation of testimony of non-Muslims. Specific land codes (1858), civil codes (1869–1876), and a code of civil procedure also were enacted.

This reformation of the Ottoman legal system is attributed to the growing presence of Western ideology within Ottoman society. Critical areas of progressive law reform such as liberalism, constitutionality, and rule of law were all characteristics of the European system and began taking effect within the sectors of law that made up the Ottoman legal system. This ideology began to overtake Sharia law in fields such as commercial law, procedural law, and penal law and through these paths eventually into family law. Areas of life such as inheritance, marriage, divorce, and child custody were undergoing progressive transformation as European influence continued its growth.
These reforms were also put in place at the insistence of the Great Powers of Europe as well as a response to them. The Europeans had begun to chip away at the edges of the Empire, and their power was growing in the region. After the Greek War of Independence, nationalism was on the rise in Europe, and Westerners thought they had a humanitarian duty to intervene on behalf of the Christians and Jews in the Ottoman Empire whom they saw as being unfairly treated. The British especially gained more power with the Treaty of Balta Liman in 1838, that required the Ottomans to abolish Ottoman monopolies and allow British merchants full access to Ottoman markets, as well as taxing them equally. Overall, the Ottoman Empire was feeling the threat of the Western powers' growing influence over the Empire in general, as well as the Jews and Christians living within the Empire. The Tanzimat reforms came about as a response to this as well as from an Ottoman desire to modernize to compete with the growing European powers.

Opposition to these legal changes can be found throughout historical accounts and historians believe that this reform was not due to popular demand of Ottoman citizens but rather to those who held power and influence within the empire.

These reforms also cultivated the version of Ottoman nationalism commonly referred to as Ottomanism. Influenced by European versions of a shared national identity, the Ottomans thought that creating an Ottoman Nationalism system where the state controlled all levels of government and social life, as opposed to the previous system where people were organized by individual community and reputation, that they could stave off the encroaching European influence over the Empire.

These reforms were based heavily on French models, as indicated by the adoption of a three-tiered court system. Referred to as Nizamiye, this system was extended to the local magistrate level with the final promulgation of the Mecelle, a code of Islamic law covering all areas of civil law and procedure except family law. In an attempt to clarify the division of judicial competences, an administrative council laid down that religious matters were to be handled by religious courts, and statute matters were to be handled by the Nizamiye courts. Family law was codified in 1917, with the promulgation of the Ottoman Law of Family Rights.

Copyright
As the Mecelle had no copyright codes, the empire's first code was the "Author's Rights Act of 1910" (Hakk-ı Telif Kanunu, 2 Düstor 273 (1910), 12 Jamad ul Awal 1328 or 22 May 1910), which only protected domestic works. The empire was not a part of the Bern Convention.

See also
 Düstur
 Corps de droit ottoman
 Législation ottomane
 Yassa
 Qanun
 Roman law
 Sharia

References

Further reading

  - About the Law of the Vilayets
  - Additional copy at Birzeit University
 

 - Alternate link
 

 
Islamic courts and tribunals
Sharia
Justice
Ottoman Empire